Klettskarð is a Faroese surname. Notable people with the surname include:

Óluva Klettskarð (born 1965), Faroese politician
Páll Klettskarð (born 1990), Faroese footballer

Germanic-language surnames